The 1977 Benin coup d'état attempt, Opération Crevette or Operation Shrimp was a failed attempt by a team of French-led mercenaries to overthrow the government of the People's Republic of Benin which was led by Mathieu Kérékou whose communist party, the People's Revolutionary Party of Benin (PRPB), was the only allowed political party in the country. The coup took place on 17 January 1977 and included a failed invasion of the port city of Cotonou by mercenaries contracted by a group of exiled Beninese political rivals.

Bob Denard was the leader of the mercenary group and although Jacques Foccart denied knowledge of the attempted coup after its failure, he did recognize that it had been backed-up by Gnassingbé Eyadéma (Togo), Félix Houphouët-Boigny (Ivory Coast), Omar Bongo (Gabon) and Hassan II (Morocco), all allies of France.

The coup would be one of several against Kérékou who survived numerous attempts to oust him, including two coup attempts in 1988.

References

Links 
 War is boring: In 1977, 80 Mercenaries Nearly Took Over Benin

Military coups in Benin
Benin coup d'état attempt
Coup attempt
Benin coup d'état attempt
Benin coup d'état attempt, 1977
Benin–France relations